The Council on Law Enforcement Education and Training (CLEET) is a government law enforcement agency of the state of Oklahoma which supports Oklahoma's state, county, and local law enforcement agencies by providing education and training which promotes professionalism and enhances competency within the ranks of Oklahoma law enforcement.

The Council is composed of 13 members, each appointed by various methods. The Council elects, from among its own members, a Chair and Vice Chair. All members of the Council serve without additional compensation. The Council appoints an Executive Director and Assistant Director to oversee the work and services of the agency.

The current CLEET Director is Steve Emmons.

Duties
CLEET has the following responsibilities and duties:
Establish guidelines and conduct basic training for all full-time peace officers in the State
Provided continuing education programs for all full-time peace officers in the State
Ensure that all agencies approved to conduct their own internal academies meet minimum standards as required by law
Establish guidelines and conduct basic training for reserve peace officers
License and regulate private security industry in the State

Relevant Statutes
Oklahoma statute Title 11: Cities and Towns §11-34-107 provides a list of issues they are required to be addressed by department policy. Complaints of non-compliance are handled by CLEET and considers the following issues including but not limited to:

 Search and seizure;
 Arrest and alternatives to arrest
 Strip and body cavity searches
 Evidence and property management
 Inventories and audits
 Use of firearms and use of force
 Pursuit driving
 Impartial policing/racial profiling
 Mental health
 Professional conduct of officers
 Domestic abuse
 Response to missing persons
 Supervision of part-time officers

Council members

Organization
Council on Law Enforcement Education and Training
Executive Director
Assistant Director
Finance Division
Private Security Services Division
Chief of Operations
Administrative Services Division
Law Enforcement Training Division

Staffing
The Council on Law Enforcement Education and Training employs 47 employees as follows:
22 in the Administrative Services Division
19 in the Training Services Division
6 in the Private Security Services Division.

Budget
For Fiscal Year 2013 CLEET's operating budget is $6.7 million. Down from 2012 which was $6.8 million.  CLEET's 2011 budget was $7.2 million.  2014 budget has not been approved by the Oklahoma Legislature at this time.

See also
Federal Law Enforcement Training Center

References

State agencies of Oklahoma
State law enforcement agencies of Oklahoma